Radical Socialists was a political party in Åsnes, Norway. The party was formed when the Åsnes local unit of Communist Party of Norway broke away on 15 December 2004. RS was constituted two months later.

RS held one seat in the municipal council of Åsnes.

The party was dissolved in 2018.

References

External links
Article about RS May Day rally 2005

2004 establishments in Norway
Åsnes
Communist parties in Norway
Defunct communist parties
Defunct political parties in Norway
Defunct socialist parties in Europe
Political parties established in 2004
Political parties with year of disestablishment missing